Josh Scherr is an American video game writer and designer best known for his work on the Uncharted series.

Career 
Josh Scherr received his Master of Fine Arts in Animation from the USC School of Cinematic Arts in 1995. He worked on several films, including Los Gringos (1999) and Dinosaur (2000), before joining Naughty Dog in 2001. He worked as the cinematics animation lead on the Jak and Daxter series (2001–05), and also led the cinematics team for the first three Uncharted games from 2007 to 2011. He supervised and co-wrote the Uncharted comic book, released from 2011 to 2012. He has been a staff writer for Naughty Dog since early 2014, co-writing Uncharted 4: A Thief's End (2016) with Neil Druckmann, and Uncharted: The Lost Legacy (2017) with Shaun Escayg. On July 15, 2022, Scherr announced his departure from Naughty Dog after 21 years with the company. In October 2022, he announced he had joined new studio Crop Circle Games as narrative director.

Works

Video games

Other

References 

Place of birth missing (living people)
Date of birth missing (living people)
Living people
American animators
American video game designers
Uncharted
Video game writers
USC School of Cinematic Arts alumni
Naughty Dog people
Year of birth missing (living people)